There are over 9000 Grade I listed buildings in England.  This page is a list of these buildings in the county of Staffordshire, by district.

City of Stoke-on-Trent

|}

East Staffordshire

|}

Lichfield District

|}

Newcastle-under-Lyme

|}

South Staffordshire

|}

Stafford Borough

|}

Staffordshire Moorlands

|}

Tamworth

|}

References
National Heritage List for England

Notes

External links

 
Staffordshire
Lists of Grade I listed buildings in Staffordshire